Kaskasatjåkka is a mountain in Sweden with an elevation of  above mean sea level (AMSL).

References

Lapland (Sweden)
Mountains of Norrbotten County